"Sólo a Terceros" (Only to Third Persons) is the first single of the Poetics album from Mexican rock band Panda.  The single was promoted by playing it in a festival, then it was played for a second time in the city of Monterrey, and it became known in the Twitter of the band's drummer (Jorge Vásquez's "Kross") that in that day the band would play the new single.

The single was not released until 22 July at EXA.fm and the video release on 27 July in a MTV exclusive, in the Los 10+ pedidos program (meaning "The 10 most asked for").
The single "Sólo a Terceros" got 1st place in the Top 100 most asked for 2009 in Northern Mexico and 3rd place in the Top 100 most asked for 2009 in Central Mexico.

Musical video
In the video, the band appears playing in a scenario they've never experienced before. A man and a woman are shown, trying to say something to each other by the words of band's vocals José Madero (because the woman doesn't want to give an explanation but her "heart" just like the man, that's why they don't talk). José appears dressed as a Priest; however, in an interview from some awards, he said that it was just a design and not a costume. The video was directed by Rodrigo Guardiola, member of band Zoé.

Charts

References

Panda (band) songs
2009 singles
2009 songs
Songs written by José Madero